James Lawrence Owens (December 30, 1899 – September 27, 1960) was a politician from Alberta, Canada. He served in the Legislative Assembly of Alberta from 1955 until his death in 1960 as a member of the Social Credit caucus in government.

Political career
Owens first ran for a seat to the Alberta Legislature in the 1955 general election as a Social Credit candidate in the electoral district of Didsbury. He defeated Coalition candidate Ben Brown by a few hundred votes.

In the 1959 general election, Owens defeated Progressive Conservative candidate Douglas Munn and a Liberal candidate.

Owens died of a heart attack on September 28, 1960, while still in office.

References

External links
Legislative Assembly of Alberta Members Listing

1960 deaths
Alberta Social Credit Party MLAs
American emigrants to Canada
1899 births